Daphne gnidioides is a shrub, of the family Thymelaeaceae.  It is found in the northeastern Mediterranean.

Description
The shrub grows to a height of 0.5 to 3.5 m.  Its leaves range from 0.4 to 0.7 cm wide and 2.5 to 4.0 cm long.  Its flowers are white, and grow in groups of 5 to 8.  It grows at altitudes ranging from 5 to 150 m, and flowers from September to November.

References

gnidioides